Kara is both a given name and a surname. In Turkic languages it means “black”, for example, the Karakoram mountains.

Notable people with the name include:

Given name 

 Kara Kennedy Allen (1960–2011), professional board member and a television producer
 Kara Arslan (r. 1144–1174 CE), Turkic rulers
 Kara Bajema (born 1998), American volleyball player
 Kara Brock (born 1974), American actress
 Kara Mahmud Bushati (1749–1796), noble of the Bushati family
 Kara Cooney, American Egyptologist, archaeologist, professor
 Kara Crane (fl. 2006–present) American actress
 Kara David (born 1973), Filipina broadcast journalist and television host
 Kara DioGuardi (born 1970), American singer-songwriter
 Kara Drew, known as Cherry (wrestler) (born 1975), American professional wrestler, manager, and former WWE Diva
 Kara Eaker (born 2002), American artistic gymnast
 Kara Edwards (born 1977), American voice actress
 Kara Fatma (1888–1955), Turkish heroine
 Kara Goldin (born 1967/68), American businesswoman
 Kara Goucher (born 1978), American long-distance runner
Kara Grainger, Australian soul blues and roots rock singer-songwriter
 Kara Hayward (born 1998), American actress
 Kara Henderson (born 1973), American sports media personality
 Kara Hultgreen (1965–1994), American aviator 
 Kara Karaev (1918–1982), Azerbaijani composer
 Kara Jackson American poet, singer, and songwriter
 Kara Kennedy (1960–2011), American corporate director and television producer
Kara Killmer (born 1988), American actress
Kara Laricks (born 1973) American fashion designer
 Kara Lawson (born 1981), American basketball coach and player
 Kara Lindsay (born 1985), American theatre actress
 Kara Lord (born 1988), Miss Guyana Universe 2011
 Kara Mbodj (born 1989), Senegalese footballer
 Kara Monaco (born 1983), Playboy model
 Kara Ahmed Pasha (died 1555), Ottoman statesman of Albanian origin
 Kara Mustafa Pasha (1634/5–1683), Ottoman military leader
 Kara Neumann case, in which parents of a sick child treated her with only prayer, resulting in the child's death in 2008
 Kara Nova (active since 2011), American pole acrobat
 Kara Yülük Osman, Turkish name of Qara Osman (before 1400–1435), Turkish ruler
Kara Ro (born 1975), Canadian boxer
 Kara Ross (born 1966/1967), American jewelry designer
 Kara Saun American designer
 Kara Scott Canadian British TV personality, journalist and poker player
Kara Swisher (born 1962), American journalist
 Kara Taitz (born 1981), American actress
 Kára Temple (born 1991), American beauty queen
 Kara Tointon (born 1983), English actress
 Kara Vallow, American television animation producer
Kara Wai (born 1960), Hong Kong actress
 Kara Walker (born 1969), contemporary African-American artist
 Kara Wilson (born 1944), Scottish actress
 Kara Winger (born 1986), American track and field athlete
Kara Wolters (born 1975), American  basketball player
Kara Zediker, American actress

Middle name
Deborah Kara Unger (born 1966), Canadian actress

Surname 

 Abir Kara (born 1983), Israeli businessman and politician
 Anksa Kara (born 1985), Cameroonian-born actress
 Ayoob Kara (born 1955), Druze Israeli politician
 Aytaç Kara (born 1993), Turkish footballer
 Burcu Kara (born 1980), Turkish actress
 Danae Kara (born 1953), Greek classical concert pianist
 Ercan Kara (born 1996), Austrian footballer
 Fatma Kara (born 1991), Turkish footballer
 Handan Kara (1939–2017), Turkish classical music singer
 Joseph Kara, also known as Mahari Kara, (c.1065 – c.1135), French Bible exegete 
 Kai Kara-France (born 1993), New Zealand mixed martial artist
 Miriam Kara (born 1938), Israeli Olympic gymnast
 Nader Kara (born 1980), Libyan footballer
 Patricia Kara (born 1972), American entertainer
 Princess Kara (born 2000), Nigerian discus thrower
 Rasim Kara (born 1950), Turkish footballer
 Theodore Kara (1916–1944), American featherweight boxer
 Sergey Kara-Murza (born 1939), Russian chemist, historian, political philosopher and sociologist
 Vladimir Kara-Murza (born 1981), Russian politician
 Vladimir Kara-Murza Sr. (1959–2019), Russian journalist and TV host

Mythical or fictional characters 

 Kára, a valkyrie in Norse mythology
 Supergirl's original Kryptonian name in the comics is Kara Zor-El, and in some of the more recent adaptations of the character she uses "Kara" in her civilian life as well:
 On the Smallville TV series she was Kara Kent.
 On Superman: The Animated Series she's not Kryptonian but is still named Kara (In-Ze).
 Her comic-book alternate-universe counterpart from Earth-2, Power Girl, is Kara Zor-L.
 On the CW Supergirl series her civilian name is Kara Danvers.
 Kara Ben Nemsi, in the works of German writer Karl May
 Kara Milovy, Bond girl from The Living Daylights
 Kara Thrace, in the reimagined Battlestar Galactica franchise
 Kara, the Jungle Princess, an Exciting Comics character
 Kara Cupper, a child character in Shining Time Station
 Kara, one of the three android protagonists of the videogame Detroit: Become Human

See also 

 Cara (given name)
 , includes a list of people with the surname Cara
Kaja (name)
Karra (name)

References

English feminine given names